Leucanopsis coniota is a moth of the family Erebidae. It was described by George Hampson in 1901. It is found in Ecuador, Bolivia, Suriname and Brazil.

References

 

coniota
Moths described in 1901